Godar-e Zard (also Romanized as Godār-e Zard; also known as Godār-e Dow Rad and Godār-e Zard-e Zārīn) is a village in Saghder Rural District, Jebalbarez District, Jiroft County, Kerman Province, Iran. At the 2006 census, its population was 32, in 8 families.

References

See also 
Gudar people

Populated places in Jiroft County